Rhopobota nasea is a species of moth of the family Tortricidae first described by Józef Razowski in 2013. It is found on Seram Island in Indonesia. The habitat consists of lower montane forests.

The wingspan is about 18 mm. The forewings are whitish with various costal strigulae (fine streaks). The markings are brownish with brown and blackish-brown dots and marks. The hindwings are brownish grey.

Etymology
The specific name refers to the shape of the ventral lobe of the cucullus and is derived from Latin nasus (meaning a nose).

References

Moths described in 2013
Eucosmini